Schiau may refer to several villages in Romania:

 Schiau, a village in Bascov Commune, Argeș County
 Schiau, a village in the town of Urlați, Prahova County
 Schiau, a village in Valea Călugărească Commune, Prahova County